Kangaslampi is a former municipality of Finland. It was consolidated to Varkaus on 1 January 2005.

It is located in the province of Eastern Finland and is part of the Northern Savonia region. The municipality had a population of 1,611 (31 December 2004) and covered an area of 412.93 km² of which 114.12 km² is water. The population density was 5.38 inhabitants per km².

The municipality was unilingually Finnish.

External links 

Populated places disestablished in 2005
Former municipalities of Finland
Varkaus